Bekim Kastrati (born 25 March 1979) is an Albanian former professional footballer who played as a forward and spent the majority of his career in Germany.

Club career
Kastrati number of German clubs including Fortuna Düsseldorf, Eintracht Braunschweig and Borussia Mönchengladbach. He joined Bonn from Dynamo Dresden in January 2010 before switching to Wuppertaler SV Borussia in May.

In January 2008, in a friendly between Fortuna Düsseldorf and Bayern Munich, Kastrati suffered a fractured testicle after colliding with Bayern's goalkeeper Bernd Dreher. He had to be brought to a hospital to undergo an emergency operation.

International career
Kastrati made his debut for the Albania national team in a March 2006 friendly match against Georgia in Tirana and earned a total of two caps, scoring no goals. His second and final international was a September 2006 European Championship qualification match against Romania.

References

External links
 
 

1979 births
Living people
Sportspeople from Peja
Kosovo Albanians
Kosovan footballers
Albanian footballers
Association football forwards
Albania international footballers
FC Wegberg-Beeck players
Aris Thessaloniki F.C. players
Borussia Mönchengladbach II players
Borussia Mönchengladbach players
Eintracht Braunschweig players
Eintracht Braunschweig II players
Fortuna Düsseldorf players
Fortuna Düsseldorf II players
Dynamo Dresden players
Dynamo Dresden II players
Bonner SC players
Wuppertaler SV players
Bundesliga players
2. Bundesliga players
3. Liga players
Kosovan expatriate footballers
Albanian expatriate footballers
Expatriate footballers in Germany
Kosovan expatriate sportspeople in Germany
Albanian expatriate sportspeople in Germany